1949–50 was the fourth season of the Western International Hockey League.

Standings

 Spokane Flyers	        38-20-2	.650
 Trail Smoke Eaters	20-23-1	.466
 Nelson Maple Leafs	19-22-3	.466
 Kimberley Dynamiters	15-27-2	.372

League Championship final

Best of 5

    * Spokane 11 Trail 3
    * Trail 9 Spokane 1
    * Spokane 4 Trail 2
    * Spokane 2 Trail 1

Spokane Flyers beat Trail Smoke Eaters 3 wins to 1.

Note: Spokane Flyers were not eligible for the Allan Cup so the Trail Smoke Eaters advanced to the final.

Semi final

Best of 5

    * Kimberley 4 Nelson 3
    * Kimberley 6 Nelson 2
    * Kimberley 5 Nelson 3

Kimberley Dynamiters beat Nelson Maple Leafs 3 wins to none.

Final

Best of 5

    * Trail 6 Kimberley 2
    * Trail 6 Kimberley 3
    * Kimberley 5 Trail 3
    * Kimberley 5 Trail 3
    * Trail 5 Kimberley 4

Trail Smoke Eaters beat Kimberley Dynamiters 3 wins to 2.

Trail Smoke Eaters advanced to the 1949-50 British Columbia Senior Playoffs.

References 

Western International Hockey League seasons
Wihl
Wihl